Wadi Zikt consists of the confluence of the lower reaches of the Wadi Wurayah and a number of other watercourses. 

The Wadi Zikt dam is also known as the Al Rahib dam. It is one of many dams built in the country for storing fresh water.  The dam was completed in 1992 or shortly after.  The dam retains about three million cubic metres of floodwater.  The main purpose of the dam is not the direct supply of water, rather, it is used to recharge groundwater by infiltration so that wells continue to function.

The small settlement of Zikt is nearby.

See also 
 List of wadis of the United Arab Emirates

References 

Geography of the Emirate of Fujairah
Hills of the United Arab Emirates